Bone is a traditionally Hungarian and modernist English surname. Notable people with the surname Bone include:

Arts and entertainment
 Drummond Bone, British academic, expert on Byron
 Gertrude Helena Bone (1876–1962), Scottish writer
 Henry Pierce Bone (1779–1855), English enamel painter
 Ian Bone (author) (born 1956), Australian writer, author and novelist
 John T. Bone (born 1947), British-born actor
 Muirhead Bone (1876–1953), Scottish artist 
 Philip J. Bone (1873–1964), English mandolinist and guitar play
 Phyllis Bone (1894–1972), Scottish sculptor
 Ponty Bone, American accordionist
 Robert Trewick Bone (1790–1840), English painter of sacred, classical and genre scenes
 Stephen Bone (1904–1958), English artist and writer

Politics
 Homer Bone (1883–1970), United States federal judge and Senator from Washington
 Ian Bone (born 1947), English anarchist
 Peter Bone (born 1952), British politician
 Scott Cordelle Bone (1860–1936), American politician, founded Iditarod Trail Sled Dog Race, Governor of Alaska

Religion
 Eleanor Bone (1911–2001), English Wiccan
 Gavin Bone (born 1964), English author and lecturer in the fields of magic and witchcraft
 Heinrich Bone (1813–1893), German educator and hymnwriter
 John Bone (bishop) (1930–2014), British religious leader

Sport
 Adrián Bone (born 1988), Ecuadorian footballer
 Alex Bone (born 1971), Scottish footballer
 Edwina Bone (born 1988), Australian field hockey player
 Jimmy Bone (born 1949), Scottish footballer
 John Gavin Bone (born 1914), Scottish Olympic cyclist
 Jordan Bone (born 1997), American basketball player
 Kelsey Bone (born 1991), American basketball player
 Ken Bone (born 1958), American basketball coach
 Mick Bone (born 1942), Australian rules footballer 
 Randall Bone (born 1973), Australian rules footballer
 Tiberiu Bone (1929–1983), Romanian footballer

Other
 Deborah Bone (1963–2014), British mental health nurse 
 Edith Bone (1889–1975), Hungarian medical professional, journalist and translator
 James Bone (1872–1962), British journalist and London editor of The Guardian

See also
 Members of Bone Thugs-n-Harmony, American rap group from Cleveland, Ohio:
 Krayzie Bone
 Layzie Bone
 Wish Bone
 Bizzy Bone
 Flesh-n-Bone
 Jay Buhner, baseball player, nicknamed "Bone"

English-language surnames